Longden is a civil parish in Shropshire, England.  It contains 19 listed buildings that are recorded in the National Heritage List for England.  All the listed buildings are designated at Grade II, the lowest of the three grades, which is applied to "buildings of national importance and special interest".  The parish contains the village of Longden and smaller settlements, and is otherwise rural.  Most of the listed buildings are farmhouses, farm buildings, houses, and cottages, the older buildings being timber framed.  The other listed buildings include a church, a small country house, a milestone, and a gazebo.


Buildings

References

Citations

Sources

Lists of buildings and structures in Shropshire